Peter Hofmann (22 August 1944 – 30 November 2010) was a German tenor who had a successful performance career within the fields of opera, rock, pop, and musical theatre. He first rose to prominence as a heldentenor at the Bayreuth festival's Jahrhundertring (Centenary Ring) in 1976, where he drew critical acclaim for his performance of Siegmund in Richard Wagner's Die Walküre. He was active as one of the world's leading Wagnerian tenors over the next decade, performing roles like Lohengrin, Parsifal, Siegfried, and Tristan at major opera houses and festivals internationally.

Hofmann's busy and demanding schedule in combination with an "imperfect vocal technique", led to intermittent vocal problems which became more prominent in the singer's opera performances in the late 1980s. These difficulties led him to completely abandon his opera career in 1989 in favor of pursuing a full-time career in popular music. Hofmann had already spent portions of his opera career performing and recording popular music, and he had already achieved success with tours and recordings of classic rock during the mid to late 1980s. He continued to perform pop and rock songs until his retirement from performance due to health reasons in 1999. He had been diagnosed with Parkinson's disease in 1994.

Early life and education
Hofmann was born in Marienbad, German Sudetenland (now modern Mariánské Lázně, Czech Republic), and grew up in Darmstadt. In his youth, before receiving any training in classical music, he was a singer in a rock band. He was a youth decathlon competitor and served seven years in the West German Armed Forces, during which time he began studying singing privately. After being honorably discharged with a financial bonus, he entered the Hochschule für Musik Karlsruhe where he was trained as an opera singer.

Opera career
Hofmann made his professional opera debut in 1972 as Tamino in Wolfgang Amadeus Mozart's The Magic Flute at Theater Lübeck. He sang his first Siegmund in Richard Wagner's Die Walküre, a role which he became closely associated with, at the Wuppertal Opera in 1974. It was as Siegmund that Hofmann first drew international acclaim when he performed the role in the historic Jahrhundertring (Centenary Ring) at the Bayreuth Festival in 1976, celebrating the centenary of both the festival and the first performance of the complete cycle, conducted by Pierre Boulez and staged by Patrice Chéreau, recorded and filmed in 1979 and 1980. He was also heard at Bayreuth as the title heroes in Parsifal (both 1976 and 1978) and Lohengrin (1979 and 1982), as Tristan in Tristan und Isolde (1986), and Walther in Die Meistersinger von Nürnberg (1988).

He subsequently appeared in Stuttgart, Paris, Vienna, London, Chicago, and San Francisco. He is best known for singing the heldentenor roles of Wagner, he has performed Siegmund, Lohengrin, Parsifal, Tristan and Loge, notably at the Bayreuth Festival where he first appeared in 1976. He was heard at the Metropolitan Opera from 1980 to 1988, in Lohengrin, Parsifal, Die Meistersinger and Die Walküre.

Light music career
At the same time as singing classic roles in opera, Hofmann was also busy performing and recording popular music. He performed concerts of Elvis Presley songs and other classic rock songs on tour across Europe. He made a number of pop albums which sold well in Europe such as Rock Classics (1982) and Love Me Tender: Peter Hofmann Sings Elvis Presley (1992). In 1987, Hallmark released  Songs for the Holidays, an album featuring Hofmann and his wife Deborah Sasson (née O'Brien, Miss Massachusetts 1971) (de).

By the late 1980s, Hofmann had abandoned opera completely in favour of musical theatre. From 1990 to 1991, he played the title role in The Phantom of the Opera, in the original Hamburg production, making 300 appearances in the show. He also hosted a TV show in Germany.

Personal life and later years
Hofmann was married and divorced twice, the second time to singer Deborah Sasson from 1983 to 1990. His divorces cost him a fortune, and he lived the last years of his life in relative poverty.

Peter Hofmann moved to Bayreuth and spent his time writing his autobiography and supporting research through the Peter Hofmann Parkinson Project. After battling Parkinson's disease for more than a decade, he died of pneumonia in November 2010 at the age of 66.

Recordings
From Bayreuth, Hofmann appeared as Siegmund in the 1980 Die Walküre (with Dame Gwyneth Jones as Brünnhilde) conducted by Pierre Boulez, in Patrice Chéreau's 1976 Ring production (Deutsche Grammophon), and in the title role of the 1982 Lohengrin (opposite Karan Armstrong as Elsa) conducted by Woldemar Nelsson (EuroArts), in Götz Friedrich's production.

In the studio, he made a 1978 recording of Die Zauberflöte under French conductor Alain Lombard with Dame Kiri Te Kanawa and Kathleen Battle, then Fidelio (conducted by Sir Georg Solti, 1979), Parsifal (opposite Dunja Vejzovic's Kundry, led by Herbert von Karajan, 1979–80; also opposite Waltraud Meier's Kundry, led by James Levine, live 1985), Orfeo ed Euridice (1982) and Der fliegende Holländer (with José van Dam and Vejzovic, conducted by von Karajan 1981–83). A 1986 performance as Lohengrin at the Metropolitan Opera, conducted by James Levine, was released on Pioneer Classics in 2000. Hofmann is also heard in Leonard Bernstein's "live" recording of Tristan und Isolde (1981).

References

Sources
The Oxford Dictionary of Opera, by John Warrack and Ewan West (1992), 782 pages,

External links
 http://peterhofmannstartenor.wordpress.com
 Peter Hofmann at the Bayreuth Festival
 

1944 births
2010 deaths
People from Mariánské Lázně
People from Sudetenland
Sudeten German people
German operatic tenors
Heldentenors
Hochschule für Musik Karlsruhe alumni
Deaths from Parkinson's disease
Deaths from pneumonia in Germany
20th-century German male musicians
20th-century German musicians
Neurological disease deaths in Germany